Johnny Riekert (born 3 February 1992) is a South African cricketer. He made his first-class debut for KwaZulu-Natal in the 2015–16 Sunfoil 3-Day Cup on 1 November 2018.

References

External links
 

1992 births
Living people
South African cricketers
KwaZulu-Natal cricketers
KwaZulu-Natal Inland cricketers
Place of birth missing (living people)